Mladen Jeremić (born January 9, 1988) is a Serbian professional basketball player for Rapid București of the Liga Națională.

Professional career
Jeremić started his pro career with Borac Čačak and later played for FMP Železnik and Hemofarm. In August 2012, he signed a 2+1 deal with Trenkwalder Reggio Emilia of the Italian Serie A. After one season he left the Italian club.
In January 2014, he signed with the Venezuelan team Bucaneros de La Guaira for the 2014 LPB season.

In July 2014, he signed with Igokea. In December 2014, he left Igokea after averaging 7.3 points and 2.2 assists per game in the ABA League. In March 2015, he signed with Metalac Farmakom for the rest of the season.

In September 2015, he signed with KK Vršac. In January 2016, he left Vršac and signed with BC Timișoara of the Romanian Liga Națională.

Serbian national team
Jeremić played for the Serbian U-19 team as they won the 2007 FIBA Under-19 World Championship, as the host nation. He continued with national team success as a part of the U-20 team, winning the gold medal at the 2008 FIBA Europe Under-20 Championship in 
Latvia. Jeremić was also a member of the team that represented Serbia at the 2011 Summer Universiade in Shenzhen, finishing as the gold medal winners.

References

External links
 Mladen Jeremić at aba-liga.com
 Mladen Jeremić at draftexpress.com
 Mladen Jeremić at eurobasket.com
 Mladen Jeremić at fiba.com

1988 births
Living people
ABA League players
Basketball League of Serbia players
Bucaneros de La Guaira players
CSU Pitești players
KK Borac Čačak players
KK FMP (1991–2011) players
KK Hemofarm players
KK Igokea players
KK Metalac Valjevo players
Pallacanestro Reggiana players
Sportspeople from Loznica
Serbian expatriate basketball people in Italy
Serbian expatriate basketball people in Romania
Serbian expatriate basketball people in Venezuela
Serbian men's basketball players
Shooting guards
Universiade gold medalists for Serbia
Universiade medalists in basketball
Medalists at the 2011 Summer Universiade